Australian rules football in China has been played since the 1990s and is growing in popularity.

Interest in Australian football in China received a boost after the AFL, the premier professional football competition in Australia, invested in an AFL exhibition match in Shanghai in 2010, an AFL academy in 2011, and built a dedicated AFL oval in Tianjin in 2011. The AFL Commission designed AFLX in 2017 as a means to promote the sport in China. It scheduled a series of AFL Premiership matches was played at Jiangwan Stadium from 2017-2019, the first outside of Pacific.

The local state TV network began broadcasting matches from Australia in 2016. The 2019 AFL Grand Final was watched by a record 5.67 million viewers.

There are a number of senior clubs spread throughout China, including in the bigger cities of Beijing, Shanghai, Guangzhou and Tianjin, as well as Auskick programs in other cities such as Suzhou, Jiangsu province.

History
Chinese Australians have been playing Australian rules football since the late 19th century. The Ballarat Chinese Football Premiership was covered extensively between 1892 and 1896, in local newspapers.

The first recorded match in Hong Kong was in 1939 played by the RAN. At least two papers posted positive reviews of the matches:

Matches were played by Australian Naval Reservists in 1940, there was hope that local Chinese would take up the game.

The Hong Kong Dragons Australian expatriate team was formed in 1990, and have been one of Asia's most successful Australian rules football clubs since this time.  The Dragons play against other Asian teams regularly and have competed at all Asian Australian Football Championships to date. Auskick, the Australian football program for juniors, grew in Hong Kong in the early 2000s after two Victorian expatriate families managed to secure official support and equipment from the AFL in Australia. The Dragons also coordinate an Auskick juniors program. Players trained at the iconic grounds at Happy Valley as well as the Australian International School Hong Kong (AISHK).

A junior program called the Gobi Desert AFL existed at a primary school in Hami, Xinjiang in the 1990s, but this has now disappeared.

A club was established in Shanghai under the name of the Shanghai Tigers in 2002.  The Tigers have a playing list consisting mainly of expatriate Australians, with some British, American and South African players as well.

Australian rules was first played in Beijing in 2004, with the foundation of the Australian Expatriate team, the Beijing Bombers.

In city of Suzhou in 2007, 18 schools had introduced the sport into their curriculum.

The sister city relationship between Tianjin and Melbourne saw the beginnings of football development in 2005.  By 2007, a development organisation called the AFL China had been formed, with Tianjin Normal University having two Australian football teams at its main campuses. The Tianjin program was sponsored by the Melbourne Football Club and the Melbourne City Council, through links formed by former Melbourne Lord Mayor John So.

The Beijing Bombers played an annual China Cup series against the other Australian expatriate team the Shanghai Tigers, as well as starting a 3-team metro league known as the Beijing AFL in 2009.

Australian football began in Macau in 2009, with the introduction of Auskick and matches at the International School of Macau.  The Macau Lightning Australian expatriate senior team debuted in 2010, with matches against the Hong Kong Dragons and Pokfulam Vikings. They made their first Asian Championships appearance in Shanghai in October 2010, but failed to win any matches at the tournament.

A second Australian expatriate team in the Pokfulam region of Hong Kong was in existence in 2010, playing as the Pokfulam Vikings and conducting some matches against the Dragons.

The Guangzhou Scorpions Australian expatriate team was formed in 2010, playing matches against the Hong Kong Dragons and Macau Lightning.

In late 2011 into early 2012 Darrell Egan Founded the Dongguan Panther Blues team at a middle school in Humen Dongguan. The team is also known in Australia as the China Blues consists of 15 to 18 years old student players, with some old school players up to the age of 20. The team went on to play Chinese teams of locals which formed in mid 2013 and is now coached under team's original captain Lin Honghue (Leighton Lin). Darrell Egan now acts as the team's Australian Liaison manager. The Dongguan Panther Blues established the first Chinese team of locals in China in 2014. Carlton Blues player Wally Koochew (See Below) being a pioneer as the first Chinese player in VFL/AFL history the Dongguan Blues team are also the pioneers in China.

National Team

A representative team mainly consisting of expat Australians in China has competed under the names China Blues and China Reds in International fixtures and Asian AFL Championships.  The first national representative team composed entirely of Chinese nationals appeared as the China Red Demons at the 2008 Australian Football International Cup. Bo Gee Lu, a native of Guangdong played Australian Rules Football while studying at the University of Adelaide and went on to represent China with significant esteem in a number of International Cups, mostly as a midfielder/forward or pinch hitting in the Ruck.

International Cup
2008: 15th
2011: 5th (Division Two)
2014: 4th (Division Two)
2017: 3rd (Division Two)

Notable players

References

 
Sport in China by sport
Australia–China relations
Australian rules football in Asia